The 2014–15 Oklahoma Sooners women's basketball team will represent the University of Oklahoma in the 2014–15 NCAA Division I women's basketball season. The Sooners were led by Sherri Coale in her nineteenth season. The team will play its home games at the Lloyd Noble Center in Norman, Oklahoma as a member of the Big 12 Conference. They finished the season 21–12, 13–5 in Big 12 play to finish in second place. They advanced to the semifinals of the Big 12 women's tournament where they lost to Texas. They received at-large bid of the NCAA women's tournament where they defeated Quinnipiac in the first round before losing to Stanford in the second round.

Roster

Schedule

|-
! colspan=9 style="background:#960018; color:#FFFDD0;"| Exhibition

|-
! colspan=9 style="background:#960018; color:#FFFDD0;"| Non-conference Regular Season

|-
! colspan=9 style="background:#960018; color:#FFFDD0;"| Big 12 Regular Season

|-
! colspan=9 style="background:#960018; color:#FFFDD0;"| 2015 Big 12 women's basketball tournament

|-
! colspan=9 style="background:#960018; color:#FFFDD0;"|NCAA Women's tournament

x- Sooner Sports Television (SSTV) is aired locally on Fox Sports. However the contract allows games to air on various affiliates. Those affiliates are FSSW, FSSW+, FSOK, FSOK+, and FCS Atlantic, Central, and Pacific.

Rankings

See also
2014–15 Oklahoma Sooners men's basketball team

References

External links
Official Athletics Site of the Oklahoma Sooners – Women's Basketball

Oklahoma
Oklahoma Sooners women's basketball seasons
Oklahoma
Oklahoma Sooners women's b
Oklahoma Sooners women's b